In geography, a cape is a headland or a promontory of large size extending into a body of water, usually the sea. A cape usually represents a marked change in trend of the coastline, often making them important landmarks in sea navigation. This also makes them prone to natural forms of erosion, mainly tidal actions, which results in them having a relatively short geological lifespan. Capes can be formed by glaciers, volcanoes, and changes in sea level. Erosion plays a large role in each of these methods of formation.

List of some well-known capes

Gallery

See also 

 Extreme points of Africa
 Extreme points of Asia
 Extreme points of Europe
 Extreme points of North America
 Extreme points of South America

References

External links

Coastal geography
Cape
Coastal and oceanic landforms
Oceanographical terminology